Jacob Safra (1891 – 27 May 1963) was a Syrian-Lebanese banker and patriarch of the Safra family. The Safras were bankers and gold traders engaged in the financing of trade between Beirut, Aleppo, Istanbul and Alexandria.

Biography
The Safra family was originally a merchant Jewish family of northern Lebanon, which historically made its money from financing the caravans of the Middle East.

When the Ottoman Empire fell apart in 1918, Jacob Safra, opened the family bank in the 1920s in Beirut, building on the Safras' long experience in gold and currency exchange. With its base in Lebanon, the  became the bank of choice for many of Syria's and Lebanon's rich Sephardic Jewish families, who trusted the Safras to manage their business and personal financial interests with care and discretion. The bank was later renamed Banque de crédit national S.A.L. (BCN) and is one of the five oldest banks in Lebanon.

In 1952, he moved to Brazil with his four sons: Elie, Edmond, Joseph and Moise. They founded a Brazilian financial institution in 1955.

Personal life
In 1920, Safra married his cousin Esther Teira (1904–1943). They had four sons: Elie, Edmond, Joseph, and Moise; and four daughters: Evelyn, Gabi, Arlette, and Ughette. In 1943, his wife died during childbirth at the age of 39. In 1950, he remarried to Marie Dwek (1911–1967).

Safra Square in Jerusalem is named in honor of him and his wife.

References

1891 births
1963 deaths
Brazilian bankers
Brazilian Sephardi Jews
Brazilian people of Lebanese-Jewish descent
Brazilian people of Syrian-Jewish descent
20th-century Sephardi Jews
Lebanese Jews
Mizrahi Jews
Safra family
Jewish bankers
Lebanese bankers
Lebanese emigrants to Brazil